Ectoedemia louisella is a moth of the family Nepticulidae. It is found from Great Britain to Ukraine, and from Denmark to Italy.

The wingspan is 5–8 mm. There are two to three generations per year with adults on wing from April to May and from July to October.

The larvae feed on Acer campestre. They mine the leaves of their host plant. The mine consists of a short superficial corridor running towards the seed. The seed is eaten out. Attacked fruits remain on the plant.

External links
Fauna Europaea
bladmineerders.nl
UKMoths

Nepticulidae
Moths of Europe
Moths described in 1849